In mathematics, sieved orthogonal polynomials are orthogonal polynomials whose recurrence relations are formed by sieving the recurrence relations of another family; in other words, some of the recurrence relations are replaced by simpler ones. Mourad Ismail later studied sieved orthogonal polynomials in a long series of papers. Other families of sieved orthogonal polynomials that have been studied  include sieved Pollaczek polynomials, and sieved Jacobi polynomials.

References

Orthogonal polynomials